Alkhas (also Romanized as Ālkhāş; also known as Alkhāş Qal‘eh) is a village in Jirestan Rural District, Sarhad District, Shirvan County, North Khorasan Province, Iran. At the 2006 census, its population was 455, in 106 families.

References 

Populated places in Shirvan County